Mohamed V may refer to:

 Al-Mu'tazz, sometimes referred as Muhammad V was the  Abbasid caliph (from 866 to 869).
 Muhammed V of Granada (1338–1391), Sultan of Granada
 Mehmed V (1848–1918), 39th  Sultan of Ottoman Empire
 Mohammed V of Morocco (1909–1961), king of Morocco
 Mohamed V Dam, located in Morocco and named after the above
 Mohammed V University, located in Rabat
 Muhammad V of Delhi (died 1557)
 Muhammad V of Kelantan (born 1969), Sultan of Kelantan and 15th King of Malaysia
 Baba Mohammed ben-Osman also known as Mohammed V (1710-1791), Dey of Algiers